George Willis (1828–1898) was a British medical doctor and politician.

Early life
Willis was born in County Cavan, Ireland.  He earned his medical degree at the University of Glasgow in 1850.

He was the elder brother of Dr. William Willis who taught medicine at the University of Tokyo and founded the medical school at the University of Kagoshima. or Kagoshima University

Career
He was one of the founders of the Cottage Hospital at Monmouth in Wales.   

He was three times elected mayor of Monmouth.

References

1828 births
1898 deaths
English politicians
19th-century British medical doctors
People from County Cavan
Alumni of the University of Glasgow